Acacia elachantha is a shrub belonging to the genus Acacia and the subgenus Juliflorae. It is native to arid parts of central and northern Australia.

Description
It blooms from July to October producing yellow flowers. The main branches coming from the base are ascending to erect, crowns have sparse foliage are normally open and spreading. The bark on most branches is smooth thin and grey but it does darken and become longitudinally fissured at base of the main mature stems. The silvery to silvery blue-green phyllodes are falcately recurved over their entire length. Following flowering red-brown to dark brown linear seed pods form. The seeds within are obloid and dark brown to black with a yellow anil.

A. elachantha is a fast growing but short-lived species usually dies after five years. It that regenerates rapidly from the large quantities of seed that it produces from an early age.

Taxonomy
The species was first formally described by the botanists Bruce Maslin and Maurice McDonald in 1997 in the work A reappraisal of Acacia cowleana and allied taxa, including the description of a new species, A. elachantha, from the tropical dry-zone of Australia as published in the journal Australian Systematic Botany.
The type specimen was collected in 1995 by McDonald and P.A.Butcher west of the Cuddapan turn off along Birdsville–Windorah road.

The only synonym is Racosperma elachanthum as described by Leslie Pedley but the name is often misapplied to Acacia cowleana.

The species name is taken from the Greek words elachys meaning small or little and anthos meaning flower referring to the smaller flower spikes compared to its closest relative A. cowleana.

Distribution
In Western Australia it is found in the Kimberley and Pilbara regions where it has a scattered distribution.
It is also found throughout the Northern Territory extending as far east as central and south west Queensland and into the far north east South Australia. 
The shrub grows mainly on sandplains in deep red sand or sandy loam soils but also occurs along watercourses or drainage lines, and on low rocky hills or lateritic plains in often skeletal soils. It is often found in disturbed areas such as road verges.
It is often part of tall open shrubland communities or in low open woodlands along with species of Eucalyptus.

Uses
A. elachantha can be used for soil rehabilitation as it is drought tolerant, fast growing and grows well in poor soils.
The seed of the plant is edible and high nutritious. The bark contains tannins and are astringent and could be used to treat diarrhoea and dysentery. The gum can also be taken to treat diarrhoea and haemorrhoids. The wood can be used for light construction, as fuel or to make charcoal.
It also useful as a nitrogen fixing plant.

Aboriginal names and uses 
The Walmajarri people of the Paruku IPA in the Kimberley call this wattle Parta.

See also
List of Acacia species

References

elachantha
Acacias of Western Australia
Plants described in 1997
Flora of South Australia
Flora of Queensland
Flora of the Northern Territory
Taxa named by Bruce Maslin